Galena Pass is a low mountain pass in southeastern British Columbia, Canada, southeast of Revelstoke.

It is located on BC 31 just east of Galena Bay on Galena Bay, connecting from that ferry terminal to Beaton on the nearby Beaton Arm of Arrow Lake.

References

Mountain passes of British Columbia
Arrow Lakes
West Kootenay